Eric "X" (Swedish: Erik Knutsson; Old Norse: Eiríkr Knútsson;  – 10 April 1216) was the King of Sweden between 1208 and 1216. Also known as Eric the Survivor (Swedish: "Erik som överlevde"), he was, at his accession to the throne, the only remaining son of King Canute I of Sweden and his queen. The name of his mother is not known, but may have been Cecilia.

Struggles for the throne

Nothing is known about his youth, but he may have been born around 1180 in Eriksberg royal manor. When Eric's father, King Canute I, died peacefully in 1195 or 1196, his four sons were youthful but not children. One of them had been hailed as heir to the throne by the grandees of the kingdom when Canute was still alive. Whether this was Eric we do not know, nor do the sources disclose the names of his three brothers. In spite of the precautions of King Canute, his sons were passed over in favour of Sverker Karlsson, the head of the rival dynasty of the Sverkers. Perhaps this was due to the influence of the mighty second-of-the-realm, Jarl Birger Brosa. As far as we know the succession took place without bloodshed.

King Canute's sons continued to live in the Swedish royal court and were raised by King Sverker. Several years later, after the death of Birger Brosa, the brothers and their supporters brought forward claims to the throne. King Sverker did not acquiesce, at which point Eric and his brothers escaped to Norway where they stayed over the winter of 1204–05. Eric and his brothers had kin ties with the Norwegian Birkebeiner party since Jarl Håkon Galen was married to their cousin, and sought their support. In 1205, the brothers returned to Sweden with Norwegian backing. However, they were overcome by King Sverker in the Battle of Älgarås in Tiveden, where all three of Eric's brothers were killed. Eric survived and once again fled to Norway where he remained for three years. In 1208 he returned to Sweden under unknown circumstances but apparently with Birkebeiner assistance. Sverker on his side received troops from King Valdemar Sejr of Denmark. In January 1208 Eric nevertheless defeated Sverker in the Battle of Lena and slew the Danish commander Ebbe Sunesen, whose troops suffered great losses. Popular tradition depicted the event as a battle between Sweden and Denmark where "two Danes ran for one Swede, and their backs were badly spanked by the Swedish men." A Danish folksong describes how "the horses of the lords return bloodied, and the saddles are empty".

Consolidation of power

Now Eric took the name of King of Sweden. Birger Brosa's son Knut had been appointed jarl at some stage but appears to have died in the Battle of Lena. Eric appointed Folke Jarl, probably another son of Birger Brosa, in his stead. This person was the originator of the Folkung party which played a political role in 13th-century Sweden and is frequently confused with the royal family that reigned after 1250.

Sverker and the archbishop Valerius fled to Denmark after the defeat and applied for the intervention of Pope Innocent III. Innocent ordered the bishops of Skara, Linköping and a third see to persuade Eric to come to terms with Sverker and return the royal prerogatives. In case of refusal, Eric would be censured by the Church. This did not have the desired effect, and in 1210 Sverker invaded Sweden in an attempt to reconquer the throne. However, he was defeated in the Battle of Gestilren in July 1210. This time Sverker was killed at the hands of Folke Jarl and his party; however, Folke was also slain together with many Folkungs. The location of the battle has been a matter of debate (Varv in Västergötland, Göstring Hundred in Östergötland, Gästre in Uppland). The banner under which King Eric's troops fought, was preserved by his kinsman the lawspeaker Eskil Magnusson of the Bjelbo family in Skara, who in 1219 gave it as honorary to his visiting Icelandic colleague Snorre Sturlasson.

Reign

The achievement of Eric was remarkable: without support by the Church, he was able to foment a network of followers in short time and defeat troops from Denmark, the major Scandinavian power at the time. After his victory, King Eric nevertheless quickly reconciled with the Danish king as well as the Catholic Church. In the same year 1210 he married princess Richeza of Denmark, daughter of the late Valdemar I of Denmark, and sister of Valdemar Sejr. This was to make up relations with Denmark, which had traditionally supported the Sverker dynasty, against the Norwegian-supported dynasty of Eric. In November 1210 he was the first (known) Swedish king who was crowned, by his former enemy Archbishop Valerius.

Not much is known about Eric's reign; written documents are few and do not give much insight in affairs during his time. However, in 1216 Innocent III confirmed Eric in the rule, not only over his kingdom, but also over any pagan lands that he may conquer in the future. Thus King Eric entertained plans of military expansion to non-Christian areas across the Baltic Sea. For the rest, his reputation is good in Swedish historiography: the short chronicle incorporated in the Law of Västergötland calls him a good årkonung (harvest king, king of good years).

Eric died suddenly of natural causes on 10 April 1216 in Näs Castle on the island of Visingsö. He was buried in the Varnhem Abbey Church. He did not leave a son at his demise, though Queen Richeza gave birth to a boy shortly afterwards (later Eric XI of Sweden). His successor was John I, a son of his rival Sverker II.

Issue
Sophia Eriksdotter (died 1241), married Henry III of Rostock
(allegedly) Martha Eriksdotter, who married the Marshal Nils Sixtensson (Sparre)
Ingeborg Eriksdotter (died 1254), married to Birger Jarl, regent of Sweden
(possibly) Marianna, who married Barnim I, Duke of Pomerania
Eric XI of Sweden (1216–1250)

Other
Skáldatal mentions that Grani Hallbjarnarson was one of Eric's court skalds.

References

Literature
 Axelson, Sven, Sverige i utländsk annalistik 900–1400 med särskild hänsyn till de isländska annalerna. Stockholm, 1955.
 Bolin, Sture, "Erik Knutsson", Svenskt biografiskt lexikon, https://sok.riksarkivet.se/Sbl/Presentation.aspx?id=15401
 Gillingstam, Hans, "Folkungaätten", Svenskt biografiskt lexikon, https://sok.riksarkivet.se/Sbl/Presentation.aspx?id=14301
 Gillingstam, Hans, "Knut Eriksson", Svenskt biografiskt lexikon, https://sok.riksarkivet.se/Sbl/Presentation.aspx?id=11661
 Gillingstam, Hans, "Utomnordiskt och nordiskt i de äldsta svenska dynastiska förbindelserna", Personhistorisk tidskrift, häfte 1, 1981. http://personhistoriskasamfundet.org/1971-1998/
 Harrison, Dick, Sveriges historia; medeltiden. Stockholm: Liber, 2002.
 Lönnroth, Erik, Från svensk medeltid. Stockholm: Aldus, 1959.
 Sandblom, Sven, Gestilren 1210. Striden stod i Uppland! I Gästre!. Enköping: Enköpings kommun, 2004.
 Wieselgren, P., Sveriges sköna litteratur: En öfverblick vid akademiska föreläsningar, Vol. II. Lund: Gleerup, 1834.
http://runeberg.org/sverhist/2/0123.html

External links

1180s births
1216 deaths
13th-century Swedish monarchs
Rulers of Finland
House of Eric
Burials at Varnhem Abbey
Sons of kings